The Polícia Aérea (Portuguese for "Air Police") or PA is the military police and ground combat force of the Portuguese Air Force.
The Air Police has as its main symbol the Blue Beret with the Emblem of the Air Force.

Missions
The Polícia Aérea has the following main missions, both in Portugal and abroad (namely in support to deployed air assets and units):
 Internal security and immediate defense of the Air Force facilities and sensitive areas;
 Ground-based air defense;
 Internal policing of the units and other bodies of the Air Force;
 Order and security enforcement.

To fulfill these missions, the PA has to maintain combat capability, employing appropriate tactics, specific equipment and war dogs. It has to be able to act both in normal security conditions as in hostile environments created by acts of terrorism, sabotage or nuclear, biological and chemical threat.

History

When created as an independent branch in 1952, the Portuguese Air Force had no military police or a permanent specialized security force to protect its bases. Initially and when needed, these tasks were entrusted to the National Republican Guard (Portuguese gendarmerie). After 1957, these tasks were transferred to the Military Police of the Portuguese Army.

At the same time, some units of the Air Force created ad hoc police detachments, sometimes referred to as Polícia da Aeronáutica (Aeronautics Police). One of the first of such detachments was the police corps created by the Lajes Air Base, on the May 31, 1955, made up of one officer, one sergeant and 32 airmen.

In the late 1950s, the Portuguese Air Force finally creates a permanent Polícia Aérea (PA, Air Police), establishing the police and close defense flights (EPDP, esquadrilhas de polícia e defesa próxima). Each air base should have one EPDP as part of its internal organization.

The PA force is greatly expanded after 1961, with the beginning of the Portuguese Overseas War and the need to defend the Air Force bases located in the theatres of operation of Angola, Portuguese Guinea and Mozambique. During this War, PA suffered more than 20 dead.

Initially, the EPDP flights were made up of Military Police personnel transferred from the Army to the Air Force. However, after 1963, the PA personnel started to be recruited directly by the Air Force, receiving a specific training at the Tancos Air Base.

In the late 1970s, following the reorganization of the Air Force bases, the former EPDP flights were replaced by the air police squadrons (EPA, esquadras de Polícia Aérea). Each EPA being made up of a headquarters, an operational flight and a support flight.

In 1981, the Corpo de Polícia Aérea (CPA, Air Police Corps) is created, headed by a Colonel or Lieutenant-Colonel, under the direct dependence of the General commanding officer of the Air Force Operational Command. This Corps groups all PA personnel and units under a single organization. The several PA units – although part of the CPA – continued to be integrated into the several Air Force bases organizations. The CPA would eventually be extinct in 1990.

Organization
The Polícia Aérea is an occupational speciality of the Portuguese Air Force, whose members are organized in mutually independent PA units, each one being subordinate to the command or base to which is assigned. At the present, no central PA organization exists.

PA field units
The standard PA field unit is the esquadra de polícia aérea (air police squadron), usually each Air Force base having one of such units assigned. Usually, the organization of an air police squadron is the following:
 Headquarters;
 Operational flight (esquadrilha operacional), including:
 Training sector,
 Ground fire range,
 Criminal investigation teams;
 Support flight (esquadrilha de apoio), including:
 Identification and control sector,
 Equipment and material sector,
 Armament section.

Special forces units
The Núcleo de Operações Táticas de Proteção (NOTP, Core of Tactical Operations of Protection) is the special forces unit of the Portuguese Air Force, being made up of Polícia Aérea members. Until recently, this unit was known as Unidade de Proteção de Força (UPF, Force Protection Unit). The NOTP is charged with missions of force protection, VIP protection and combat search and rescue, as well as other possible classified missions.

Disbanded in 2006 and also made up of PA elements, the Unidade de Resgate em Combate (RESCOM, Combat Rescue Unit) was the former special forces unit of the Portuguese Air Force.

Recruitment and training
The candidates to the occupational specialty of Polícia Aérea receive specific training at the Military and Technical Training Center of the Air Force located at Ota. Depending on the prior qualifications of the candidate, this training lasts 30, 25 or 20 weeks. Officer candidates must hold a bachelor's degree as the minimum prior qualification.

Uniform
The members of the Polícia Aérea wear the same uniforms of the rest of the members of the Portuguese Air Force, however with a blue beret instead of the standard side or peaked caps. In some occasions, a white brassard with the letters "PA" in blue is used. In the past, a blue helmet with a white stripe and white "PA" letters was used, but this uniform item has been discontinued.

Equipment

Infantry weapons

Pistols

 Heckler & Koch USP
 Heckler & Koch USP Compact (special forces);

Submachine gus 

 Heckler & Koch MP5 A3, MP5K and MP5 SD6 
 Heckler & Koch UMP (special forces);
 Heckler & Koch MP7A1 (special forces);

Assault rifles 

CZ BREN 2 (special forces);
Heckler & Koch G36;
 Heckler & Koch HK416A5 (Used by JTAC);
 Heckler & Koch HK417A2 (special forces);
Heckler & Koch G3A3/A4;

Machine guns 

Heckler & Koch MG4 (special forces);
Heckler & Koch MG5 (special forces);
Rheinmetall MG3;
 Browning M2;

Shotguns 

 Fabarm STF 12 (special forces);
Benelli M3;

Sniper rifles 

 Sako TRG-22 (special forces);
 Heckler & Koch G28E (special forces);
 Heckler & Koch MSG-90 A1 (special forces);
M82 Barrett rifle (special forces);

Grenade launchers 

 Heckler & Koch AG36;
 Heckler & Koch HK69A1;

Anti-tank missiles 
Instalaza C90-CR;
M72 LAW m/78;

Armored Vehicles
3x HMMWV 1165A1/B3
 12x Condor UR-425 APC ;

References

External links
 ANPA, Air Police National Association 
 UPF in Real Thaw 11 exercise

Portuguese Air Force
Military provosts of Portugal
Air force police agencies
Military of Portugal